Yin may refer to:

the dark force in the yin and yang from traditional Chinese philosophy and medicine
Yīn (surname), a Chinese surname
Yǐn (surname), a Chinese surname
Yìn (surname), a Chinese surname
Shang dynasty, also known as the Yin dynasty 
Yinxu or Yin, the Shang dynasty capital now in ruins
Yin (Five Dynasties period), a short-lived kingdom during China's Five Dynasties and Ten Kingdoms period
Yin Mountains, a mountain range in Inner Mongolia and Hebei province in China
Yin (yǐn), an office of early China sometimes equivalent to prime minister and sometimes to governor
Prime minister (Chu State), known in Chinese as Lingyin.